Mantor Library is an academic library at the University of Maine at Farmington in Franklin County, Maine. The library was dedicated on June 15, 1965.

References

External links
 Official Website

Libraries in Franklin County, Maine
Library
University and college academic libraries in the United States
Libraries established in 1965
1965 establishments in Maine